Deblois or DeBlois is a surname. In French, the name translates into "from Blois", a city in central France.

People with this surname
 Charles Deblois (born 1939), member of the Canadian House of Commons
 Dean DeBlois (born 1970), Canadian film director, screenwriter, and animator
 George Wastie Deblois (1824-1886), businessman and political figure in Prince Edward Island
 Joseph-François Deblois (1797-1860), lawyer, judge and political figure in Lower Canada
 Lucien DeBlois (born 1957), retired professional ice hockey right wing and centre who played from 1977 to 1992
 Pierre Antoine Deblois (1815-1898), Quebec farmer, businessman and political figure
 Tony DeBlois (born 1970), American blind autistic savant and multi-instrumentalist

See also
 Deblois, Maine, place in the United States
 DeBlois, Prince Edward Island, settlement in the Canadian province of Prince Edward Island

References